Saint-Marc-sur-Mer is a seaside resort in France, situated in the commune of Saint-Nazaire (principal place of the arrondissement of Saint-Nazaire, in the department of Loire-Atlantique, region of Pays de la Loire). Originally named Crépelet, at the end of the 19th century it was given the name of the saint to whom its chapel was dedicated.

The birthplace of "Monsieur Hulot" 

From the summer to autumn of 1951, the town's beach was the filming location for the exterior scenes of Jacques Tati's comedic film Monsieur Hulot's Holiday. Tati spent weeks searching for a suitable location, and upon discovering Saint-Marc wrote that it was "the little corner I have been dreaming of". The Hôtel de la Plage, which appeared as the holiday residence of the titular Monsieur Hulot, still exists, and was renovated in 2010. Some scenes were shot in studios, notably those set in the hotel's restaurant; but many key scenes were shot on location, such as the tennis match, which took place in the garden of the Château de Saint-Marc, and the beach scenes, at Saint-Marc's beach.

In 1999, at the request of Tati's daughter, a statue of Tati as Monsieur Hulot by sculptor Emmanuel Debarre was erected on the seafront. It originally included Hulot's signature pipe, which was removed by vandals not long after its unveiling.

Coastline and beaches 

It has numerous southeast-facing beaches, including:
 the beach of Fort de L'Ève, with a large campsite
 the beach of la Courance (lifeguard-supervised in summer), renowned as a location for bodyboarding and skimboarding
 the beach of Saint-Marc (lifeguard-supervised in summer)
 the beach of Saint-Eugène
 the beach of Grand Traict, known among surfers for its surf spots
 the beach and manor of Géorama
 the beach of the Petite Vallée, partly naturist.

The , the boundary between the Loire estuary and the Atlantic Ocean, is the site of the Fort de Chemoulin, occupied by the French Navy, who manage Chemoulin's semaphore watchtower  and control maritime traffic into the entrance of the estuary. The fort is also a  coastal monitoring station.

Beyond Chemoulin, the coast is oriented to the southwest and includes:
 the beach of Jaunais cove, sometimes called Chemoulin cove, well protected from the wind by high cliffs, a naturist beach
 the beach of Jaunais (lifeguard-supervised in summer) is the final beach of Saint-Marc, at the boundary of the town of Pornichet.

References

Citations

Bibliography 
 Stéphane Pajot, Les Vacances de Monsieur Tati: Hulot à Saint-Marc-sur-Mer. Éditions d'Orbestier, Le Château d'Olonne, 2003.

Saint-Nazaire
Port cities and towns on the French Atlantic coast
Tourist attractions in Loire-Atlantique